Art Griffiths (9 September 1924 – 11 August 2018) was a Canadian rower who competed in the 1948 Summer Olympics and in the 1952 Summer Olympics.

Biography
Griffiths went to the Westdale Secondary School in 1940 and graduated in 1943. Griffiths started rowing in 1940 at Westdale. During World War II, he became a pilot for the Royal Canadian Air Force until 1946. After the war, Griffiths resumed his rowing career for the Leander Boat Club. As a member of Leander, he rowed at the 1948 and 1952 Summer Olympics for Canada. Griffiths retired from rowing in 1954.

References

1924 births
2018 deaths
Canadian male rowers
Olympic rowers of Canada
Rowers at the 1948 Summer Olympics
Rowers at the 1952 Summer Olympics
20th-century Canadian people